Events in the year 1819 in Norway.

Incumbents
Monarch: Charles III John

Events
 Morgenbladet, the first Norwegian daily newspaper, was released for the first time.

Arts and literature
 Det Dramatiske Selskab in Fredrikshald is founded.

Births
5 August – Valdemar Knudsen, sugar cane plantation pioneer in Hawaii (d.1898)
13 March – Henriette Wienecke, composer (d. 1907)

Full date unknown
Ivar Christian Sommerschild Geelmuyden, politician (d.1875)
Sivert Christensen Strøm, jurist and politician (d.1902)

Deaths
3 March – Jens Stub, politician (born 1764)
30 October - Anders Hansen Grønneberg, farmer and politician (born 1779).

See also

References